Unwritten Rule may refer to:

Unwritten Rule (band)
Unwritten Rule (NCIS: Los Angeles)